

Kaecilius

Elloe Kaifi

Kala

Jennifer Kale

Noble Kale

Kaluu

Kamikaze

Kamran
Kamran is a fictional character appearing in American comic books published by Marvel Comics. He was created by G. Willow Wilson and Takeshi Miyazawa and first appeared in Ms. Marvel (vol. 3) #13 (March 2015).

Kamran is a young Pakistani American who discovers his Inhuman heritage after being exposed to the Terrigen Mists which grants him bio-luminescent abilities. After moving from Houston to Jersey City, Kamran is reintroduced to Kamala Khan whose parents are friends with his, and the two quickly bond over their shared interests. After witnessing Kamala change into her alter ego, Ms. Marvel, Kamran reveals his secret to her, which makes her smitten with him.  Kamran offers Kamala a ride to school, but instead of taking her to school, he kidnaps her and takes her to his boss, the Inhuman crime boss Lineage who hopes to recruit Ms. Marvel into his gang.  Ms. Marvel can fight off Kamran and Lineage and escape from them.  Desperate to prove himself to Lineage, Kamran kidnaps Kamala's brother Aamir and exposes him to stolen Terrigen Mists to awaken Aamir's Inhuman powers.  Despite the substance not being Terrigen Mists, Aamir gains the ability to generate psychic force fields which he uses to overpower Kamran. 

Sometime later, Kamran approaches Ms. Marvel, apologizing for his actions, and attempts to reconcile with her. They are interrupted by Shang-Chi, who reveals that Kamran had stolen the mystical Eyes of the Dragon from the Five Weapons Society and was planning on using them to steal Ms. Marvel's life force to empower Lineage. Ms. Marvel, Shang-Chi, and the Five Weapons Society can apprehend Kamran and recover the Eyes.

Kamran in other media
Kamran appears in the Marvel Cinematic Universe / Disney+ series Ms. Marvel, portrayed by Rish Shah. This version is a Jinn, a member of the Clandestine, and the son of the group's leader Najma. While attempting to recruit Kamala Khan to aid them in breaking the Veil of Noor, his relationship with Najma becomes strained due to his perceived inability to do so fast enough. After Najma eventually realizes the error of his ways and sacrifices herself to close the Veil of Noor, she transfers her powers to Kamran, but initially lacks control of them and gets into trouble with the Department of Damage Control before Khan rescues him and sends him to Pakistan to work with the Red Daggers.

Garrison Kane

Kang the Conqueror

Kangaroo

Frank Oliver

Brian Hibbs

Karkas

Karma

Karn

Karn is a member of the Inheritors from the Spider-Verse storyline who wanders the Multiverse to slay Spider Totems. He first appeared in The Superior Spider-Man #32 (September 2014), and was created by Dan Slott, Christos N. Gage, and Giuseppe Camuncoli.

During the hunt against Master Weaver, he hesitates to deliver the finishing blow, leading to the death of his mother. As a result, he is condemned to wear a mask by his father Solus, and exiled to hunt Spider Totems to earn his place back in the family.

The time-displaced Superior Spider-Man (Otto Octavius's mind in Peter Parker's body) later discovered Karn. Assembling an army of Spider-Men, the Superior Spider-Man and his team ambushed Karn while hunting the Spider-Man of Earth-2818, but despite Karn continuing to gain the upper hand, the Spider-Men only escaped when two of Karn's estranged siblings showed up and began fighting. Karn later joins the Spider-Men in their fight against the Inheritors.

Karn realizes that Master Weaver is his future self. He establishes a new team of multiversal spider-heroes called the Warriors of the Great Web, consisting of Mayday Parker, Spider-Ham, Spider-Man Noir, Spider-Man India, and Spider-Gwen.

During the "Electroverse saga", an alliance of counterparts of Max Dillon invades Loomworld, damaging the great web while forcing the Web-Warriors to retreat to Earth-803. Karn and an alternate version of Doctor Octopus managed to fix the Web, but tangle it at the same time, causing the Web Warriors to become split between realities. Karn's reconnection of Earth-803 into the web also causes an earthquake that frees the Electros caught by the Web-Warriors.

During the Dead No More: The Clone Conspiracy storyline, Karn welcomes Kaine Parker, but soon realizes that he no longer has the powers of the Other and is now dying from a Carrion virus, and cannot go back to his Earth lest someone catch it. Karn shows Kaine many realities with zombie apocalypses caused by this disease, and Kaine decides to visit these realities to find a way to stop it. Kaine tries to keep himself hidden from the Web Warriors while researching, but is caught by Spider-Gwen.

During the "Spider-Geddon" storyline, each of the Spider-Men and Master Weaver has been keeping an eye on Earth-3145 by sending different Spider-Bots to check on them, discovering that while alive, the Inheritors have gotten malnourished from lack of spider life-forces. Unknown to the Spider-Men and apparently to Master Weaver himself, the Inheritors are collecting the heads of the Spider-Bots with Jennix stating that they now have the resources they need. When Spider-UK and Master Weaver get alerted to an Inheritor Cloning Engine on Earth-616, the two of them figure out what is happening. On Earth-3145, Jennix has put the Spider-Bot heads to good use by harvesting their transmitters. As they are unable to send a kill signal to the Inheritor Cloning Engine, Spider-UK advises Master Weaver to call the Web Warriors. When Master Weaver states that nobody can fight the Inheritors and win, Spider-UK states that they'll die trying to keep another world from being destroyed. Karn is then confronted by Verna for having sided with the Web Warriors as they fight to the death. After Karn stabs Verna, she still feeds on him as he is now a Spider-Totem. When Karn's dead body is found by Spider-Nor-Man, it is devoured by Spiders-Man of Earth-11580.

 Powers and abilities
Like the rest of the Inheritors, Karn can drain the life force from other beings through physical contact. Depending on the power of the individual he drains, his powers and vitality can increase substantially. He also has superhuman strength, speed, reflexes, and durability. He has a staff that emits a unique energy signature capable of vaporizing people.

As Master Weaver, Karn threads the Web of Life and Destiny, gaining dominion over various realities. He can open portals at his command or alter realities.

Karn in other media
 Karn appears as a boss character in the video game Spider-Man Unlimited, voiced by Matthew Mercer.
 Karn appears as a boss character in the video game Marvel: Avengers Alliance.

Karnak

Karnilla

 

Karnilla the Norn Queen is a sorceress and the Queen of Nornheim (one of the Asgardian provinces) within the Marvel Comics Universe. She has been depicted as an enemy of Asgard, an ally of Loki, and love interest of Balder the Brave.

In her debut appearance, Karnilla saved Balder the Brave from being assassinated by Loki; justifying this action by saying that, like everything that existed in Asgard (with the exception of mistletoe) she promised to protect Balder. She then lent Loki magic using the Norn stones.

Later, she accidentally granted the Wrecker supernatural power that was intended for Loki. Then allying with Loki, and tricking Sif into animating the Destroyer. During this plan she became romantically attracted to Balder. She declared her love for Balder, but was spurned. Heartbroken, she pitted Balder against the ''Legion of the Lost''. She tried to tempt Balder to renounce his service to Odin, and then capture Balder. She then saved Balder and the Warriors Three from the Thermal Man.

Karnilla cast a spell waking Odin in time to defeat Infinity. She finally forced Balder to renounce Odin and serve her instead, though before long she released Balder from her service. With Loki, she created Durok the Demolisher to battle Thor.

Additionally she allied with Thor against Mangog and Igron. She and Balder then defended Asgard against an assault of animated suits of armor. They then battled the Enchantress and Executioner, but were defeated by Kroda the Duelist. She later battled Loki to save Balder.

After a while, she was rejected again by Balder, who had given up his career as a warrior on returning from the dead. Undaunted, she abducted Balder and his new beloved, Nanna. Karnilla forced Balder to agree to marry her to save Nanna's life. With Loki, she then released a Snow Giant to battle Thor, but betrayed Loki and was defeated by him. She later sought Balder's forgiveness for Nanna's death.

Karnilla revealed the location of the Rose of Purity to the Enchantress. She then joined in an alliance of Loki and Tyr against Odin. Later, she was petitioned by Balder to join forces with Asgard against Surtur.

Karnilla then schemed to keep Balder with her in Nornheim. However, she eventually came to regret her actions as she had truly fallen in love with him. She was then captured by Utgard-Loki and the Frost Giants, who tormented and humiliated her by cutting her long black hair down to a flat top and forcing her to be their slave. She was rescued by Balder and Agnar and returned to Nornheim.

She later saved Balder from the forces of Seth. Some of her subjects which had been turned to stone were then returned to life, although still stone. Karnilla joined with a resistance force against the death-goddess Hela. Her allies included the Warriors Three, the wolf-prince Hrimhari, various troll races and the mortal New Mutants. The goal of saving Odin from death at the hands of Hela was accomplished.

Following the Fear Itself storyline, Karnilla began to prepare an attack on the now-Earthbound Asgard. Her first assault was to replace Thor (killed by the Serpent with a wound that created a rift in time and space) with a new thunder god Taranus (really a disguised Ulik), with all of Thor's allies memories being altered so that they remember Taranus rather than Thor, save for Loki.

Karnilla came to the defense of Asgard when Hela's armies of the dead threatened it.

Powers and abilities
Karnilla is a member of the race of superhumans known as Asgardians, giving her superhuman strength, speed, stamina, durability, agility, and reflexes. She also possesses additional powers through her manipulation of the forces of magic, including the enchantment of physical and sensory abilities, physical malleability, temporary paralysis or sleep, inter-dimensional teleportation, energy projection and deflection, elemental conversion, and illusion-casting. She can even cast permanent spells interdimensionally with no significant preparation or effort.

Karnilla possesses vast knowledge of magical spells and enchantments of Asgardian origin, granting her skills that have been described as equal to those of Loki, or surpassed only by Odin among Asgardians.

Alternate versions
In the Ultimate universe version of Asgard, Karnilla is a central member of the Royal court. Her favor is sought through light-hearted games of wrestling and sparring.

Karnilla in other media
 Karnilla appears in The Avengers: Earth's Mightiest Heroes episode "This Hostage Earth", voiced by Kari Wahlgren. Masters of Evil members the Enchantress and the Executioner raid her lair for her Norn Stones, serving as a distraction for the Grey Gargoyle to petrify Karnilla.
 Karnilla appears in Thor & Loki: Blood Brothers.

Vasily Karpov
Vasily Karpov is a fictional character appearing in American comic books published by Marvel Comics. The character first appeared in Captain America (vol. 5) #5 (March 2005), and was created by Ed Brubaker and Michael Lark. He was an officer of Soviet Russia during World War II. Due to jealously to Captain America, Karpov was the original handler of Bucky Barnes / Winter Soldier as well as being the mentors of Aleksander Lukin and Alexi Shostakov / Red Guardian.

Vasily Karpov in other media
Vasily Karpov appears in the Marvel Cinematic Universe film Captain America: Civil War (2016), portrayed by Gene Farber. This version is a member of Hydra. In the early 1990s, he arranged the assassinations of Howard Stark and Maria Stark in order to use a Super Soldier serum for additional Winter Soldiers which kept in suspended animation. In the present, Karpov is interrogated and killed by Helmut Zemo.

Karthon the Quester

Kazann
Kazann is a fictional character appearing in American comic books published by DC Comics. Created by Garth Ennis and Clayton Crain, and first introduced in Ghost Rider: Road to Damnation #1 (November 2005).

Kazann is a demon who has found a way to bring Hell to the world, opposed by the angel Malachi and Ghost Rider.

Ka-Zar

Robert Kelly

Kelpie
Kelpie is a member of the UK superhero team The Union. Kelpie represents Scotland in the team. She has the power to control water, as well as being able to transform her hands into sharp claws.

Kestrel

Aamir Khan

Aamir Khan is a fictional character appearing in American comic books published by Marvel Comics.

Aamir Khan is the son of Muneeba and Yusuf Khan and the older brother of Kamala Khan.

Aamir Khan
Aamir Khan appears in Ms. Marvel portrayed by Saagar Shaihk.

Kamala Khan

Muneeba Khan

Muneeba Khan is a fictional character appearing in American comic books published by Marvel Comics.

Muneeba is the mother of Kamala Khan.

Muneeba Khan in other media
Muneeba Khan appears in Ms. Marvel, portrayed by Zenobia Shroff.

Muneeba Khan appears in Marvel Rising: Secret Warriors, voiced by Meera Rohit Kumbhani.

Yusuf Khan

Yusuf Khan is a fictional character appearing in American comic books published by Marvel Comics.

Yusuf Khan is a banker who is the father of Kamala Khan.

Yusuf Khan in other media
Yusuf Khan appears in Ms. Marvel, portrayed by Mohan Kapur.

Yusuf Khan appears in Marvel's Avengers, voiced by Brian George.

Khonshu

Khora of the Burning Heart
Khora is a fictional character appearing in Marvel Comics. She is a mutant from Arakko. She first appeared in Empyre: Aftermath Avengers. She is affiliated with the S.W.O.R.D. group.

KIA

Kiber the Cruel

Kid Cassidy

Kid Colt

Blaine Colt

Elric Freedom Whitemane

Kid Kaiju

Kid Omega

Killer Shrike

Simon Maddicks

Unnamed

Aldrich Killian

Erik Killmonger

Killpower

Killraven

Kimura

Kindred

Hannibal King

King Bedlam

Kingmaker

Wallace

Bullseye's Father

Pryor Cashman

Kingpin

Roderick Kingsley

Laura Kinney

Kirigi
Kirigi is a fictional ninja assassin appearing in American comic books published by Marvel Comics. The character first appeared in Daredevil #174 (September 1981), and was created by Frank Miller. He was a deadly assassin of The Hand. A faithful servant of their then present "Jonin", Kirigi is said to not die. He survived impalement by Elektra and continued to pursue the female assassin after a short recuperation. Kirigi is next decapitated by Elektra while the former was on fire and this seemed to end or severely curtail his existence. However, Kirgi's head and body were reattached and reanimated by the Hand and he returned to attack Daredevil. This time his body was destroyed by fire which appeared to end his life again. After he fell, Stick's allies destroyed his body.

Kirigi in other media

 Kirigi appears in the film Elektra (2005) as the main antagonist, portrayed by Will Yun Lee. In addition to being a master swordsman, this version is able to move and attack at superhuman speed. Elektra challenged Kirigi in a final battle on who should get the Treasure (a girl named Abby). They fought but Kirigi got the upper hand, beating Elektra around until she realized he killed her mother when she was a child. Kirigi then ran up, but Elektra impaled him in the chest with a sai and flipping him into a well, where he disintegrated while falling.
 Kirigi is a boss in the Daredevil video game. He believes that Daredevil was working for the Kingpin and he has sent the Daredevil to kill, since the Hand was at war with the Kingpin's gang. Kirigi is seemingly killed by Daredevil after he is defeated.
 Kirigi appears as a villain in the MMO Marvel Heroes.
 Kirigi was considered to appear in the live-action series Daredevil, but gets replaced with Nobu Yoshioka (portrayed by Peter Shinkoda).

Kismet

Kiwi Black

Klaatu

Klaw

Kleinstocks

Kly'bn

Kly'bn is a fictional deity created by Greg Pak and Fred Van Lente and first appeared in Incredible Hercules #117, while being first mentioned in Runaways (vol. 2) #14 in contrast to his wife Sl'gur't who first appeared in Fantastic Four Annual #24 of July, 1991.

Millions of years ago, after the Celestials had created the Skrull Eternals, Deviants and Prime, the Deviant Skrulls wiped out the other two branches believing that they themselves were the superior branch, leaving only one member of each wiped branch. Kly'bn was the last Skrull Eternal, who convinced the Deviant Skrulls and their Queen Sl'gur't that killing him would be killing themselves, as he was the embodiment of the idea of the Skrull and it was his destiny to lead the Skrulls into changing the other worlds with their truth. Sl'gur't embraced his ideas and became lovers with the two becoming gods of the Skrull Pantheon. Since Kly'bn was unable to shapeshift, Sl'gur't vowed to never keep her form for too long in contrast to her husband. The couple together wrote the Book of World Skrull, where there was written three prophesies. These prophesies told about the eventual destruction of the Skrull homeworld and about Earth being the new home for the Skrulls. These prophesies were the main reason of the events of "Secret Invasion", being a holy war for the Skrulls. When the God Squad arrived at their fortress via Nightmare's realm, Kly'bn and Sl'gur't were forced into battling them. Sl'gur't was eaten by the Demogorge, but since she represented multiple different deities, the Demogorge exploded due for being too much. Sl'gur't then started a shapeshifting battle against Amatsu-Mikaboshi, with them copying each other. Eventually, Mikaboshi in Sl'gur't form killed Sl'gur't who was in Mikaboshi's form, allowing him to replace her. After Kly'bn killed Ajak, Hercules started battling Kly'bn. Hercules was able to defeat Kly'bn, after Snowbird impaled him with the spine of the Demogorge.

Kly'bn reappeared as one of the dead deities serving Amatsu-Mikabosi during "Chaos War".

The Knave

Misty Knight

Knockout

Knull

Amiko Kobayashi
Amiko Kobayashi was created by Chris Claremont and John Romita Jr., and first appeared in The Uncanny X-Men #181 (May 1984). Amiko found herself orphaned when she and her mother were caught in a battle between the X-Men and a dragon. Discovering the dying woman and her young daughter, Wolverine promised that the girl would be raised as though she were his own child. In the limited series Wolverine: Soultaker, Amiko discovered that her mother belonged to a family of warriors called the Shosei and now spends time with them trying to improve her martial arts skills, and hoping to make her adoptive father Logan proud of her.

Kobik

Kobik is a physical manifestation of a Cosmic Cube in the Marvel Comics universe.

The character, created by Chris Bachalo, first appeared in Marvel NOW! Point One #1 (June 2015).

Within the context of the stories, Kobik originated from a S.H.I.E.L.D. project using fragments of Cosmic Cubes. The pieces merge into a single being that adopts the form of a child. Kobik becomes a member of the Thunderbolts.

During her time affiliated with S.H.I.E.L.D., Kobik is involved in the Pleasant Hill project, where supervillains are taken to a pre-created town and brainwashed to act as normal civilians. At the same time, Kobik comes into contact with the Red Skull, the Cube's past experience with the Skull giving her a certain attachment to him. Using his influence on her, the Skull is able to convince her of Hydra being a noble organization. Kobik later makes contact with the elderly Steve Rogers during a stand-off where his life is in danger, and as a consequence of the Skull's manipulation, she not only reverts him to his youthful state but also rewrites his history so that he has been a Hydra sleeper agent since childhood. As Hydra's "Secret Empire" rises to power in the United States, Kobik begins to regretfully rewrite Rogers' mind, but it is revealed that the memory of his original, good conscious has remained hidden in her mind. The original Steve Rogers tries to convince Kobik to undo her mistakes, but she believes it is too late and is frightened of Hydra Rogers. Making things worse, in the real world Arnim Zola implants a Cosmic Cube into Rogers' physical body during the Resistance's hopeful raid on Hydra's main base, led by Sam Wilson. However, the good Rogers manages to get through to her, and eventually, they are both saved by Bucky Barnes and Scott Lang, who takes away Hydra Rogers’ ability to use both the Cosmic Cube and Mjolnir, allowing the real Captain America to defeat his mind-altered self. After Hydra Rogers is defeated, Kobik restores the history of the world, although she leaves some aspects intact from the Hydra-created reality.

Eric Koenig

Komodo

New Men

Melati Kusuma

Korath the Pursuer

Korg

Korrek

Korvac

Korvus

Kraglin

Kraken

Sea monsters
The first Kraken made multiple appearances in Marvel continuity, including The Avengers #27 (April 1966, Marvel Comics), Tales to Astonish #93 and Sub-Mariner #27 (July 1970), before returning years later in the second issue of the limited series Fallen Son: The Death of Captain America (#1-5, June-August 2007)., and in The New Invaders #4 from April 2014.

A Kraken appeared in the short story "When Strikes the Kraken!" in Kull the Destroyer #17 (October 1976), and was reprinted in Chronicles of Kull 2: The Hell Beneath Atlantis and Other Stories.
Another Kraken (a gigantic squid) debuted in the black and white Bizarre Adventures #26 (May 1981).

A creature called The Black Kraken debuted in the short story "Red Shadows and Black Kraken!" (based on the 1968 fantasy novel Conan of the Isles written by L. Sprague de Camp and Lin Carter featuring Robert E. Howard's hero Conan the Barbarian. The story is republished in the graphic novel Conan of the Isles.) in Conan the Barbarian Annual #7 (1982).

Another version of the Kraken (four-armed and reptilian in appearance) debuted in Marvel Comics Presents #121 (January 1993). It returned in Marvel Action Hour featuring the Fantastic Four #2-4 (December 1994-February 1995) and in the one shot title Namora #1 (August 2010); it would later be featured in the video game Marvel Ultimate Alliance. A Kraken (a horned squid creature) appeared in the 2009 one-shot comic Sub-Mariner Comics: 70th Anniversary Special., while another (a house sized crab/octopus hybrid) appeared in Fantomex Max issues #2 and #3. This Kraken was modified into a remote controlled cyborg to protect an underwater base of a brilliant scientist.

Two additional versions possessed ties to Greek mythology. The first served the Olympian Gods and debuted in the one shot Chaos War: God Squad #1 (February 2011) before returning in The Incredible Hulk (vol. 2) #622 (April 2011). The second Kraken appeared in the four-part limited series Wolverine/Hercules: Myths, Monsters & Mutants. Spirited away by the god Poseidon after a defeat by Greek hero Perseus, the creature is revived in modern times by King Eurystheus to battle the heroes Hercules and Wolverine.

Daniel Whitehall

Jake Fury

Unnamed
A new Kraken is seen when the new Madame Hydra is collecting members for her HYDRA High Councel to assist Captain America, whose history had been altered by Red Skull's clone using the powers of Kobik to include him always being a member of HYDRA. It is implied this person is someone Steve Rogers knows and believes to be dead.

Kraken in other media
 Daniel Whitehall appeared in the live-action Marvel Cinematic Universe television series Agents of S.H.I.E.L.D., portrayed by Reed Diamond.
 The sea creature version of Kraken appeared in the Ultimate Spider-Man animated television series episode "Return to the Spider-Verse" Pt. 2. This version is a giant squid that resides in a cartoon pirate-themed alternate reality. Following a mutiny against their captain Web Beard, pirate versions of Howard the Duck, Rocket Raccoon, and Cosmo the Spacedog attempt to force their former captain as well as Spider-Man and Kid Arachnid to walk the plank and feed them to the Kraken. After the monster gets hit with debris and attacks their ship, the Groot, Spider-Man and Kid Arachnid persuade Web Beard and the mutineers to settle their differences and help to fight the Kraken.
 The sea creature version of Kraken appears in the video game Marvel: Ultimate Alliance. Loki disguised as the Mandarin released it to attack the heroes.

Krakoa

Krang

Kraven the Hunter

Sergei Kravinoff

Alyosha Kravinoff

Ana Kravinoff

Simon Krieger
Simon Krieger is a minor character appearing in American comic books from Marvel Comics. The character, created by Kurt Busiek and Patrick Zircher, first appeared in Iron Man: The Iron Age #1 (June 1998). He was the Vice President of Roxxon's predecessor Republic Oil & Natural Gas, having arranged the murders of Howard Stark and Maria Stark to secure an attempted takeover of Stark Industries. Krieger next impersonates Tony Stark, nearly fooling Happy Hogan and Pepper Potts before using his personal enforcers in holding political hostages at the Helicarrier but his scheme gets exposed by Iron Man, and he is killed while in jail.

Simon Krieger in other media
 Elements of Simon Krieger's personality and actions are incorporated into Aldrich Killian (portrayed by Guy Pearce), who appears in Iron Man 3. 
 Simon Krieger appears in Spider-Man: Miles Morales, voiced by Troy Baker. This version is Roxxon's corrupt head of R&D. He sought to have Roxxon Plaza, the company's headquarters, powered by Nuform, but secretly killed its developer Rick Mason for trying to expose Nuform's deadly properties and took credit for its creation. Krieger comes into conflict with the Tinkerer, who seeks revenge on him by leading the Underground criminal group in an all-out war against Roxxon, and Spider-Man, who works to contain the subsequent chaos. Krieger hires the Rhino and the Prowler to capture them while he modifies Harlem's Nuform reactor to destroy Harlem, but Spider-Man and the Tinkerer escape and destroy the reactor. Afterward, Krieger is arrested.

Kro

Kronos

Kronos is a fictional character appearing in American comic books published by Marvel Comics.

Kronos is an Eternal and the brother of Uranos who became a cosmic entity as a result of his experiments.

Krugarr
Krugarr is a fictional character appearing in American comic books published by Marvel Comics. He is a Sorcerer Supreme in the Earth-691 timeline of the fictional Marvel Universe.

Krugarr appeared in the Marvel Cinematic Universe film Guardians of the Galaxy Vol. 2 (2017).

Publication history 
Krugarr first appeared in Guardians of the Galaxy Annual #1 and was created by Jim Valentino.

Fictional character biography 
In the 22nd century, Doctor Strange finds a Lem named Krugarr on the planet Lemista. He agrees to become Strange's apprentice and learn the ways of magic. Krugarr later succeeds Strange as the Sorcerer Supreme. Strange, who takes on the title of the Ancient One, is later slain by the villain Dormammu.

Krugarr takes on Talon as an apprentice. Talon later declares that Krugarr was forced to reject him for not being able to keep up with his studies. Despite this, the two entities remain friends. Talon attributes this to being a 'nice flake'. Despite the lack of studying, Krugarr has managed to teach Talon simple magic, such as levitation.

During a battle with a murderous gang of vigilantes, Major Victory is shot in the head. Hollywood brings him to Krugarr, who manages to save his life. During this incident, they share a psychic link, which lasts long after Major Victory is healed.

Some time later, the world that is controlled by the entity Mainframe is rocked with disasters due to the interference of an ancient Earth virus. Krugarr is summoned by Martinex via the highly advanced 'Star' worn by Guardians and their allies. Krugarr, who had just established his Sanctum Sanctorum on his homeworld of Lem, regretfully declines because there is a crisis growing in the "Dark Dimensions". Krugarr's telepathically sends Hollywood to help. Hollywood joins with several other powerful superheroes to save the innocent survivors of Mainframe's world. This spurs the creation of the Galactic Guardians.

Powers and abilities 
As a Sorcerer Supreme, Krugarr has the ability to perform a great many magical spells such as mystic bolts, flight, astral projection, and calling upon various magical entities.

Other versions
The Earth-616 version of Krugarr appeared during the Infinity War storyline as a member of the Mourners.

Krugarr in other media
Krugarr makes a non-speaking appearance in the live-action Marvel Cinematic Universe film Guardians of the Galaxy Vol. 2 (2017). This version is a member of the Ravagers and an associate of Yondu Udonta. Following Udonta's death, Krugarr meets with Starhawk, Martinex T'Naga, Charlie-27, Aleta Ogord, and Mainframe and reunite their original group in Udonta's memory.

Krystalin

Kubik
Kubik is a Cosmic Cube who first appears in Tales of Suspense #79 (July 1966), and as Kubik in The Avengers #289 (March 1988). The concept was created by Stan Lee and Jack Kirby and refined by Ralph Macchio. Kubik (once evolved into humanoid form and now a student of the entity the Shaper of Worlds) returns to Earth when attracted by an anomaly possessing a fraction of its power — revealed to be the robot the Super-Adaptoid. The Super-Adaptoid uses its abilities to "copy" Kubik's abilities and banishes the character, intent on creating a race in its own image. The Super-Adaptoid, however, is tricked into shutting down by Captain America. Kubik returns and then removes the sliver of the original Cosmic Cube from the Super-Adaptoid that gave the robot its abilities. Like all Cosmic Cubes, Kubik possesses the ability to manipulate extra-dimensional energy to alter reality to achieve virtually any effect. Upon reaching maturity, a cube takes on humanoid form with its behavior modeled after the individuals who have possessed it. Kubik's chest also displays a holographic representation of a Cosmic Cube.

Shen Kuei
Shen Kuei, also known as "The Cat", was created by Doug Moench and Paul Gulacy and first appeared in Master of Kung Fu #38-39 (March–April 1976). He is a freelance espionage operative, and has been both an enemy and ally of Shang-Chi. He is a master thief whose skill in martial arts equals Shang-Chi's. The meaning of the character's name is both similar and opposite to Shang Chi's name.

Kull

Marduk Kurios
Marduk Kurios is a demon character created by Gary Friedrich and Herb Trimpe. He first appeared in Marvel Spotlight #13 (Jan. 1974) and was identified as "Satan." He is also presented as the father of the characters Daimon Hellstrom and Satana. Within the context of the stories, Marduk Kurios is a high level demon and ruler of one realm of Hell who has from time to time presented himself as "Satan" or "Lucifer". During the Fear Itself storyline, Marduk Kurios attended the Devil's Advocacy where they talked about the Serpent's actions on Earth. Marduk Kurios taunted Mephisto during this meeting. His name comes from the Babylonian god Marduk, and the Greek word κύριος ("lord, master").

In other media
On May 1, 2019, it was announced that a television series based on Kurios' child Daimon Hellstrom will premiere on Hulu in 2020. Titled Helstrom was announced to be produced by Marvel Television and ABC Signature Studios. Per initial reports, Daimon is the son of a serial killer (Kurios) and has a sibling name Ana. "The siblings have a complicated dynamic as they track down the terrorizing worst of humanity, each with their attitude and skills." The show runner and executive producer is Paul Zbyszewski.

Kurse

Algrim
Kurse was originally the most powerful of a race of Dark Elves and known as Algrim the Strong He is coerced by the Dark Elf ruler Malekith the Accursed to fight the Asgardian God of Thunder and superhero, Thor. Malekith, however, betrays Algrim while he is fighting Thor, and in a bid to destroy the Thunder God orders that a pitfall beneath the two be opened. Thor saves himself courtesy of his mystical hammer Mjolnir, while Algrim falls into lava. Algrim's enchanted armor saves his life, but he is critically injured and develops amnesia from the shock, and is left with an obsessive desire for revenge.

Algrim is later healed by the cosmic entity the Beyonder, who transforms him into the much more powerful being called Kurse. The Beyonder transports Kurse to Earth to battle Thor, but Kurse mistakes Thor's ally Beta Ray Bill for Thor and battles him. Kurse then battles the juvenile superhero team Power Pack. Thor dons his magical belt of strength to double his strength and confronts Kurse, but the Beyonder doubles Kurse's strength as well. With the assistance of Power Pack, Thor and Bill are able to overcome Kurse, and Thor helps him remember that it was Malekith, not Thor, who is to blame for his suffering. The Beyonder then transports Kurse to Hel at Thor's suggestion, to frustrate Hela, the Goddess of Death.

Kurse later confronts and severely beats Loki, who had been disguised as Malekith. Drawing off, he leaves Loki injured and finds someone who seems to be Balder the Brave, surrounded by legions of Asgardians. He barrels through them and slays his target, who turns out to be the true Malekith. After repenting, he is granted citizenship among the Asgardians.

He is designated as the guardian of the children of Asgard after helping to protect Volstagg's daughter and adopted sons during a plague, and loyally serves Asgard until the time of Ragnarok. At the time of Ragnarok, all the Asgardians apparently perish, with the exception of Thor.

Kurse is later captured by Malekith, who strips him of the armor. Algrim is sent to Nastrond Prison where he is forced to serve out the rest of the sentence of Wazaria, a former member of the League of Realms. Malekith forces Wazaria to don the armor, transforming her into the new Kurse. Before he is imprisoned, Algrim encourages his successor to kill herself the first chance she gets.

Waziria
Waziria is a Dark Elf witch of the Dove Gut Tribe in Svartalfheim.

When Malekith escaped from his imprisonment and attacked his village, he cut off Waziria's left arm when using her as a hostage when Thor and his fellow Asgardians arrived. After recuperating, Waziria joined up with the League of Realms to hunt down Malekith.

When the League of Realms split, only Waziria remained with Thor. During a meeting with the Dark Elf ruling council called the Council of the Unhallowed, Thor accused Waziria of being the traitor and that she gave Malekith the information to stay one step ahead of him, only for both to learn that it was Thor himself who had been bugged. Malekith then makes himself known. Before Malekith can kill Thor, the League of Realms showed up to help fight Malekith. The Council of the Unhallowed made the decision to side with Malekith. When the Congress of the Worlds planned to have Malekith rule Svartalfheim after he is done with his life sentence in Nastrond Prison, Malekith made Waziria his proxy while Malekith named Scumtongue his senator for the Congress of the Worlds.

After stripping Algrim of his armor, Malekith transformed Waziria into the new Kurse while Algrim takes Waziria's place in Nastrond Prison.

During the "War of the Realms" storyline, Kurse was present with Malekith as he begins his invasion on Midgard. She and Enchantress fight She-Hulk and Ghost Rider until Jane Foster slams Skidbladnir into Enchantress. After the Queen of Angels has no knowledge on why her soldier Fernande sided with Spider-Man and the League of Realms, Malekith states that he is leaving Kurse to assist her. In London, Volstagg controls the Destroyer Armor to defeat Kurse.

Kurse in other media

Film
 Algrim appears in the film Thor: Tales of Asgard (2011), voiced by Ron Halder. After being forced to ally with Surtur, his race was killed by Frost Giants. Seeking revenge on Asgard for abandoning them, Algrim steals Surtur's sword, but is ultimately killed by Loki in a fit of rage.
 Algrim appears in the Marvel Cinematic Universe film Thor: The Dark World (2013), portrayed by Adewale Akinnuoye-Agbaje. This version is a close subordinate of Malekith the Accursed who becomes the last of the Dark Elves' monstrous Kursed soldiers, gaining significantly augmented strength and fused with the armor he wore at the time. He overpowers Thor, but is killed by Loki via a Dark Elf grenade.

Video games
 Kurse appears as a mini-boss in Marvel: Ultimate Alliance, voiced by Tom Kane.
 Kurse appears as a group boss in Marvel: Avengers Alliance.
 Kurse appears in Marvel Heroes.
 Kurse appears as a playable character in Lego Marvel Super Heroes, voiced by Andrew Kishino.
 Kurse appears in the Thor: The Dark World - The Official Game, voiced by Dennis T. Carnegie.

Kylun

K'ythri

K'ythri is a fictional deity created by Warren Ellis and Carlos Pacheco and first appeared as a depiction along with his wife Sharra in Starjammers #1.

According to the Shi'ar mythology, the two chief deities, K'ythri and Sharra, were the creators of the universe. At first, they were enemies to each other, but were then forced into marriage, in which they found love. At their day of marriage, K'ythri presented her the M'Kraan Crystal as their sign of love.

They were worshipped by the Shi'ar for millennia, until they were killed by Amatsu-Mikaboshi, but it seems that they had come back to life.

They were then convinced by Loki that they needed to force the new Thor to take part on their Challenge of Gods in order to prove their superiority. Even though they outscored Thor, thanks to their disposition to cause mass suffering in order complete certain tasks, the challenge's officiate Shadrak declared Thor as the winner, since she inspired the Asgardians gods to help her in defense.
Infuriated, they called upon "their sister" the Phoenix Force to destroy all reality, but with the help of Quentin Quire, Thor and the Asgardians appeased the Phoenix Force. Sharra and K'ythri were then imprisoned in Omnipotence City, since they had broken the divine law.

References

Marvel Comics characters: K, List of